Tanakpur railway station is a small railway station in Champawat district, Uttarakhand. Its code is TPU. It serves Tanakpur city. Tanakpur Now Broad gauge. The platform is well sheltered. It many facilities including water and sanitation. It is the terminus of the line in Eastern Uttarakhand.

Due to the steep slope of the line in that region, a train rolled backwards uncontrolled for 35 km after a brake failure, but was stopped at Khatima by putting sand on the tracks.

Major trains 

 Tanakpur–Delhi Express (14555) 
 Tanakpur–Singrauli Triveni Express (15074) 
 Shaktinagar Terminal–Tanakpur Express (15076) 
 Tanakpur–Pilibhit Passenger (55372)

References

Railway stations in Champawat district
Izzatnagar railway division